Devendra Murgaonkar (born 2 November 1998), is an Indian professional footballer who plays as a forward for Indian Super League club Goa.

Career

Youth and early career
Born in Panaji, Devendra begins his football career with Salgaocar SC. During 2017–18 Goa Professional League season Devandra made his debut for Salgaocar in the Goa Professional League. Devendra scored 20 goals for Salgaocar during 2018–19 Goa Professional League season and also he was named as the league top scorer for that season. During 2019–20 Goa Professional League he scored 9 goals for the club.

FC Goa
On 1 October 2020, Devendra joined Indian Super League side FC Goa on a three-year deal, after Salgaocar was paid an undisclosed transfer fee. On 11 December 2020, Devendra made his professional debut for Goa against Jamshedpur. He came on as a 58th minute substitute for  Alexander Romario as Goa won the match 2–1. On 6 January 2021, Devendra scored his first goal in Indian Super League as well as for Goa in the 81st minute against East Bengal, taking the game to a 1–1 draw.
He made his debut in AFC Champions League on 14 April against Al-Rayyan SC after coming in as substitute for Ishan Pandita.

Murgaonkar scored his second goal for the club on 11 December against Bengaluru FC in their 2–1 win. He scored his third goal on 19 February 2022 against Hyderabad in their 3–2 defeat.

Career statistics

Club

Honours
Goa
ISL League Winners Shield: 2019–20
Durand Cup: 2021
Individual
Durand Cup Top Scorer: 2021

References

External links

Devendra Murgaonkar at Indian Super League

Indian footballers
1998 births
Living people
People from Panaji
Footballers from Goa
Association football forwards
Goa Professional League players
Indian Super League players
Salgaocar FC players
FC Goa players